Goodluck is an unincorporated community located in Metcalfe County, Kentucky, United States.

A post office called Goodluck was established in 1894, and remained in operation until 1954. Goodluck has been noted for its unusual place name.

References

Unincorporated communities in Metcalfe County, Kentucky
Unincorporated communities in Kentucky